Luhansk People's Republic–Russia relations were bilateral relations between Russia and the Luhansk People's Republic (LPR). The LPR is widely internationally unrecognized, with most of the international community regarding the LPR as a Russian military occupation of a portion of Ukraine's Luhansk Oblast (over 90% as of October 2022). The LPR was annexed by Russia on 30 September 2022; the LPR authorities willingly acceded to Russia, and the annexation is widely internationally unrecognized. From April 2014 to September 2022, the LPR portrayed itself as an independent state, and it was widely regarded as a puppet state of Russia by the international community.

Background 

The Luhansk People's Republic was proclaimed in April 2014, declaring independence from Ukraine. It was proclaimed in the territory of Ukraine's Luhansk Oblast, in the Donbas region. The LPR separated from Ukraine through military force, with assistance from Russia.

A referendum was held by the newly-declared LPR authorities, asking citizens of Luhansk Oblast to agree or disagree to the creation of the new republic. The referendum was deemed illegal by the Ukrainian government and by most governments in Europe, except for Russia.

The Donetsk People's Republic was created in a similar manner in the neighbouring Donetsk Oblast in Ukraine in April 2014. Meanwhile, in February–March 2014, Russia annexed Crimea in southern Ukraine, following a declaration of independence by the "Republic of Crimea".

LPR–Russia relations

Unofficial relations (2014–2022) 
Documents issued by the Donetsk and Luhansk People's Republics have been valid in Russia since 2017. This allowed residents to work, travel, or study in Russia. The head of state, Leonid Pasechnik made a deal with Russia to evacuate citizens to southern parts of Russia.

Ever since Russia has been establishing diplomatic relations with the LPR. Both sides have signed a treaty of friendship, cooperation, military aid and assistance. Russia has given out more than 600,000 Russian passports to the citizens of the republics and has backed the rebels with guns and artillery. Russia also recognizes the Ukrainian-controlled areas as part of the rebels. Russia has also ordered troops to serve as peacekeepers in the separatist-held regions of the Donbas. Relations still stay strong between the two states.

Official relations (2022–present) 
Russia officially recognised the Luhansk People's Republic on February 21, 2022.

On March 27, 2022, the head of LPR Leonid Pasechnik announced plans to hold a referendum on joining Russian Federation.

After annexation of Southern and Eastern Ukraine, Luhansk People's Republic was officially merged into Russia.

See also
 Donetsk People's Republic–Russia relations
 Foreign relations of Russia

References

 
Russia
Bilateral relations of Russia
Luhansk
Separatism in Ukraine